Ketley Town Halt railway station was a station in Ketley, Shropshire, England. The station was opened in 1936 and closed in 1962.

The station was located on the Severn Valley Line, which ran from Hartlebury to Shrewsbury. The station was a small halt, with minimal facilities and was primarily used by local residents and commuters. The station had a single platform, with a small shelter for passengers.

The station was closed as part of the Beeching cuts, a process of rationalisation of the British railway system in the 1960s. The Severn Valley Line was deemed uneconomical to run and the station, along with many others on the line, was closed.

References

Further reading

Disused railway stations in Shropshire
Railway stations in Great Britain opened in 1936
Railway stations in Great Britain closed in 1962
Former Great Western Railway stations